12002 Suess, provisional designation , is an Eoan asteroid from the outer regions of the asteroid belt, about  in diameter. It was discovered by Czech astronomers Petr Pravec and Lenka Kotková (Šarounová) at Ondřejov Observatory on 19 March 1996. The asteroid was named after Austrian geologist Franz Eduard Suess, following a suggestion by Herbert Raab.

Orbit and classification 

Suess is a member of the Eos family, the largest asteroid family in the outer main belt consisting of nearly 10,000 asteroids. It orbits the Sun at a distance of 2.7–3.3 AU once every 5 years and 3 months (1,917 days). Its orbit has an eccentricity of 0.11 and an inclination of 9° with respect to the ecliptic.

The body's observation arc begins with a precovery taken by the Digitized Sky Survey at the Siding Spring Observatory in November 1982, almost 14 years prior to its official discovery observation at Ondřejov .

Physical characteristics

Diameter and albedo 

According to the survey carried out by the NEOWISE mission of NASA's Wide-field Infrared Survey Explorer, Suess measures 6.309 km in diameter and its surface has an albedo of 0.177.

Lightcurves 

As of 2017, no rotational lightcurve of Suess has been obtained from photometric observations. The asteroid's rotation period, poles, and shape remain unknown.

Naming 

This minor planet was named after Austrian geologist Franz Eduard Suess (1867–1941/2), son of geologist Eduard Suess and professor at the Technical College in Prague and superintendent at the Imperial Geological Institute of Vienna. Franz Eduard made fundamental studies on  moldavites and coined the term "tektite", which are ejecta from meteor impact events. The official naming citation was published by the Minor Planet Center on 24 January 2000. The lunar crater Suess, as well as the crater Suess on Mars, however, are named after his father.

References

External links 
 Dictionary of Minor Planet Names, Google books
 Asteroids and comets rotation curves, CdR – Observatoire de Genève, Raoul Behrend
 Discovery Circumstances: Numbered Minor Planets (10001)-(15000) – Minor Planet Center
 
 

012002
Discoveries by Petr Pravec
Discoveries by Lenka Kotková
Named minor planets
19960319